John Sweeney or Sweeny may refer to:

Politics and law
John A. Sweeney (born 1941), American politician in the New Jersey General Assembly
John Bernard Sweeney (1911–1981), judge of the Australian Industrial Court
John E. Sweeney (born 1955), U.S. Representative from New York
John Sweeney (Canadian politician) (1931–2001), Canadian, politician and educator
John James Sweeney (born 1927), Pennsylvania politician
John Sweeney (labor leader) (1934–2021), American president of AFL-CIO
John Sweeney (Australian politician) (1863–1947), member of the New South Wales Legislative Assembly
John Sweeney (Ohio politician), member of the Ohio House of Representatives
John Sweeny (judge), American judge in  New York State

Other
John Sweeny (bishop) (1821–1901), Canadian Roman Catholic bishop
John Sweeney (police officer) of the Metropolitan Police Service, detective superintendent in charge of Operation Withern
John A. H. Sweeney (1930–2007), American museum curator and author
John Thomas Sweeney (born 1956), former boyfriend and murderer of American actress Dominique Dunne
John Sweeney (journalist) (born 1958), investigative journalist and writer
John Sweeney (footballer), Scottish footballer, played for Dunfermline Athletic FC in the 1961 Scottish Cup Final
 John J. Sweeney (professional speaker) (born 1965), American keynote speaker and author
John Sweeny, settler for whom the town of Sweeny, Texas, U.S., was named

See also
John Swinney (born 1964), Scottish politician